F45 Training is an Australian franchisor and operator of fitness centers based in Austin, Texas. It has over 1,750 studios in 45 countries across Australia/Oceania, North America, South America, Asia, Europe and Africa. It is currently one of the fastest growing fitness franchises globally, with over 550 in Australia and over 650 in the United States. The fitness franchise was launched in 2011 by Adam Gilchrist and Rob Deutsch as part of a move to modernize gym participation.

About 
F45 offers thousands of exercises, customized training systems, circuit movement patterns, timing modules and workouts that change on a daily basis. Each F45 studio has access to these training systems. Integrated technology is a key aspect of the systematic aesthetic – with the same video workout demonstrations and F45 DJ playlists played across all studios. Its drawing capacity is its 45-minute session that combines high-intensity interval training (HIIT), functional training and circuit training. The fusion of interval, strength and cardiovascular training is targeted at burning fat while building lean muscle.

Programs
Programs are constantly being created and changing, with more than 50 different routines, including the Pipeline, Moon Hopper, and Renegade workouts.

History 
In 2012, the first F45 studio was launched in Paddington, Sydney. It was here that Rob Deutsch took the time to work on the fitness model within the studio each day. After the success of its first studio, Deutsch enlisted the help of franchisee expert, Adam Gilchrist, who quickly became his business partner when they decided to franchise the F45 business. In 2013, Gilchrist and Deutsch sold their first F45, and in 2014 they began a franchise roll-out in Sydney with 15 franchises bought by members of the original F45 studio in Paddington.

Off-shore expansion 
In 2015, the duo sold their first off-shore franchise in New Zealand. This marked a two-year milestone of 250 franchises in the Oceania region. In 2015, Gilchrist and Deutsch sold their first F45 studio in the United States, sparking a rapid US expansion. That same year, F45 also launched in India, with the help of Australian cricketer Brett Lee and Indian cricket legend VVS Laxman. The first store opened in Hyderabad — the capital and largest city of the Indian state of Telangana. This triggered an expansion with many more studios opening in major Indian cities, such as Bangalore, Chennai, Raipur and Gurgaon.

In 2017, Gilchrist and Deutsch entered the United Kingdom with 50 franchises sold—35 of which opened in London, and 15 across Brighton, Bournemouth, Birmingham and Manchester.

Between 2017 and 2018, F45 launched the beginning of its European growth strategy, opening studios in Finland, Switzerland, Czech Republic and Germany. F45 simultaneously increased its US presence through its Collegiate Program, which entailed a partnership between F45 and U.S. colleges in an effort to permeate the young influential group of individuals.

In the first half of 2019, the fitness franchise secured a deal to open studios in Afghanistan and Iraq, as well as in Kenya and Mauritius in Africa – taking their presence to over 40 countries. In 2019, Mark Wahlberg Investment Group and FOD Capital announced that they were buying a minority stake in the F45 business. It is reported that this investment will facilitate further global expansion for the company. The deal values the company at US$450 million (AU$672 million).

In June 2019, the fitness franchise launched Prodigy, a new training program for teens/adolescents.

Products and services 
There are a number of different products and services that make up the F45 brand:

Team training 
The 45-minute group workout classes are F45's main offering throughout the week with a 60-minute session on Saturdays. Each workout is led by two trainers who are there to offer correctional support or modifications.

F45 Challenge 
The F45 Challenge is based upon a holistic model that encompasses fitness, nutrition and lifestyle. It runs for six or eight weeks and offers its members training and nutritional coaching through a digital app that includes daily meal plans and calorie tracking. There is also an option to receive delivered meals to your doorstep. Its drawing card is its rapid physical transformation, as well as the cash prizes for male and female participants (each F45 studio conducts its own Challenge). The before and after Challenge photos have become a notable aspect of the fitness brand, showcasing images of members' physical progress from the beginning and end of the Challenge. Their circulation on the web and around social media has been a key aspect of F45's marketing and engagement efforts.

Prodigy classes 
Prodigy is an additional, more recent service offered by F45, designed to provide adolescents with greater strength, mobility and increased well-being. It is a group-based exercise class that caters for kids (between 11 and 17) of different fitness levels and capabilities. Through teaching functional movements, it aims to increase motor skills to develop coordination, balance, and muscle strength, and to promote bone density and muscle development.

Equipment 
F45 uses a number of basic functional equipment within a relatively small space, with equipment varying day-to-day depending on what type of session it is. Common equipment includes: mat, resistance band, bench, bosu balance trainer, exercise ball, kettlebell, dumbbell, medicine ball, sand bag, battle ropes, weights, barbell, exercise bike, indoor rower, sled. Heart rate monitoring equipment during training using the F45 LionHeart.

Awards 
The franchise ranked 68th on Entrepreneur's Franchise 500 in 2020, and 297th in 2019, as well as #13th on Entrepreneur's Fastest Growing Fitness Franchise 500 in 2020. They also were named one of Fast Company's 'Most Innovative Wellness Companies of 2020.'

References 

Gyms
Health clubs in Australia
Health care companies established in 2011
2011 establishments in Australia
Companies based in Sydney
2021 initial public offerings